KAXW-LD, virtual and UHF digital channel 35, is a low-powered  television station serving Waco, Texas, United States that is licensed to Mullin. The station is owned by the DTV America Corporation.

Digital channels
The station's digital signal is multiplexed:

External links
Query Rabbitears
DTV America
Azteca America Website

Low-power television stations in the United States
Innovate Corp.
Television channels and stations established in 1984
AXW-LD